Jerzy Feliks Fedorowicz (born 29 October 1947 in Polanica Zdrój) is a Polish actor, theatre director, poet, politician, a former member of the Sejm (2005–2009), and member of the Senate (2015–).

After graduating from the Academy for the Dramatic Arts in Kraków, he became an actor of Teatr Rozmaitości in Kraków (Variety Theatre in Kraków), Teatr Dramatyczny (Dramatic Theatre) in Szczecin (1970–1971) and Teatr Stary (The Old Theatre) in Kraków (1971–1989). Since 1989, he has been a managing and artistic director of the Teatr Ludowy (The People's Theatre) in Nowa Huta.

He was one of forerunners of an art therapy method. In 1991 and 1992, Fedorowicz directed the play Romeo and Juliet, for which he cast local skinheads and punks.
He was elected to Sejm on 25 September 2005; getting 5694 votes in 13 Kraków district as a candidate from the Civic Platform list, and more recently was elected to the Senate in 2015.

Selected filmography
 Hero of the Year (1987)

See also
Members of Polish Sejm 2005-2007

References

External links 
 Official Website 
 Parliamentary page 

Civic Platform politicians
1947 births
Living people
People from Kłodzko County
Polish theatre directors
Polish male stage actors
Recipients of the Silver Medal for Merit to Culture – Gloria Artis
Recipients of the Gold Cross of Merit (Poland)
Members of the Polish Sejm 2005–2007
Members of the Polish Sejm 2007–2011
Members of the Polish Sejm 2011–2015
Members of the Senate of Poland 2015–2019
Members of the Senate of Poland 2019–2023
Polish actor-politicians